Snake bite chicken is a controversial dish served in Guangdong and Chongqing China, though its exact origin is unknown.  The dish consist of a venomous snake being forced to bite a chicken.  After the chicken is envenomated and dies, it is then served.

Description
The foshan dish cooking method is made by forcing a venomous snake to bite a chicken.  The chicken is bitten and poisoned through the head.  It may take more than 10 minutes for the chicken to die.  A strong chicken may require several bites.  After the chicken dies, it can be served in a pan for 98 Chinese yuan.  If it is served with both the chicken and the snake, it costs 118 yuan.

Controversy

A controversial video was made from a Guangdong restaurant.  It was then broadcast and generated a large number of anti-Cantonese comments.  When a reporter asked a notable professor from Sun Yat-sen University about the health benefit of the dish, he claimed that it was only his first time of hearing about the dish.  Health authorities in Guangdong have already told restaurants to stop serving the dish.  Chongqing have also joined in.

See also
 List of chicken dishes

References

Cantonese cuisine
Chinese chicken dishes
Snake products